Achatina is a genus of medium-sized to very large, air-breathing, tropical land snails, terrestrial pulmonate gastropod mollusks in the family Achatinidae.

Distribution
There are some 200 species of Achatinidae in Sub-Saharan Africa. Some species are kept as terrarium animals due to their size and colourful shells.

Shell description
Snails in this genus have medium to large shells which are ovate in shape and often colourfully streaked.

Species 
Species within the genus Achatina include:
 Achatina achatina Linnaeus, 1758 or giant African snail, Agate Snail or Ghana Tiger Snail, from Western Africa (Liberia through Nigeria) grows to be the largest land snail on Earth.
 Achatina ampullacea Böttger, 1910
Achatina balteata Reeve, 1849 - Cameroon to Central Angola.
 Achatina bandeirana Morelet, 1866
 Achatina bayaona Morelet, 1866
 Achatina bayoli Morelet, 1888
 Achatina bisculpta E. A. Smith, 1878
 Achatina connollyi Preston, 1912
 Achatina coroca Bruggen, 1978
Achatina craveni E. A. Smith, 1881 - Congo, Tanzania.
Achatina dammarensis Pfeiffer - Botswana
 Achatina ellioti E. A. Smith, 1895
 Achatina greyi Da Costa, 1907
 Achatina hortensiae Morelet, 1866
Achatina iostoma Pfeiffer, 1854 - Cameroon
Achatina iredalei Preston, 1910
 Achatina lechaptoisi Ancey, 1894
 Achatina obscura Da Costa, 1907
  Achatina osborni Pilsbry, 1919
 Achatina marginata Swainson, 1821
Achatina passargei von Martens 
 Achatina pfeifferi Dunker, 1845
 Achatina purpurea (Gmelin, 1790)
 Achatina randabeli Bourguignat, 1889
Achatina schinziana Bousson - Botswana
Achatina schweinfurthi von Martens, 1873 - East Africa.
Achatina semisculpta Dunker, 1845 - East Africa
Achatina smithii Craven, 1881
Achatina stuhlmanni von Martens, 1892 - Uganda.
Achatina sylvatica Putzeys, 1898 - Congo
Achatina tavaresiana Morelet, 1866 - Angola
Achatina tincta Reeve, 1842 - Congo, Angola
Achatina tracheia Connolly, 1929 - Southeast Africa
 Achatina transparens Da Costa, 1907
Achatina variegata Roissy
Achatina vignoniana Morelet, 1874: synonym of Achatina (Tripachatina) vignoniana Morelet, 1874 
 Achatina virgulata Da Costa, 1907
 Achatina welwitschi Morelet, 1866
Achatina weynsi Dautzenberg, 1891 - Congo
 Achatina wildemani Dautzenberg, 1907

incertae sedis:
 Achatina vassei Germain, 1918 - The internal anatomy of this species is not known, and therefore the generic classification of ‘Achatina’ vassei cannot be made.

Species brought into synonymy
Achatina albopicta E. A. Smith, 1878 - along the coast of Kenya and Tanzania: synonym of Lissachatina albopicta (E. A. Smith, 1878)
 Achatina allisa Reeve, 1849: synonym of Lissachatina allisa (L. Reeve, 1849)
 Achatina bloyeti Bourguignat, 1890: synonym of Lissachatina bloyeti (Bourguignat, 1890)
 Achatina capelloi Furtado, 1886: synonym of Lissachatina capelloi (Furtado, 1886)
 Achatina fulgurata Pfeiffer, 1853 - Senegal: synonym of Achatina eleanorae Mead, 1995
 Achatina drakensbergensis Melvill & Ponsonby, 1897 : synonym of Cochlitoma drakensbergensis (Melvill & Ponsonby, 1897)
 Achatina eleanorae Mead, 1995: synonym of Lissachatina eleanorae (Mead, 1995)
 Achatina fulica Bowdich, 1822 or giant East African snail from Eastern Africa is a serious pest in the many tropical countries where it has been introduced, and is listed as an invasive species by some governments: synonym of Lissachatina fulica (Bowdich, 1822)
 Achatina glaucina E. A. Smith, 1899: synonym of Lissachatina glaucina (E. A. Smith, 1899)
 Achatina glutinosa Pfeiffer, 1854 - Mozambique: synonym of Lissachatina glutinosa (L. Pfeiffer, 1854)
 Achatina gundlachi L. Pfeiffer, 1850: synonym of Geostilbia gundlachi (L. Pfeiffer, 1850)
 Achatina immaculata Lamarck, 1822 - Southeastern Africa: synonym of Lissachatina immaculata (Lamarck, 1822)
 Achatina johnstoni E. A. Smith, 1899: synonym of Lissachatina johnstoni (E. A. Smith, 1899)
 Achatina monochromatica Pilsbry (Deprecated. Old historical synonym of Achatina achatina var. monochromatic)
 Achatina mulanjensis Crowley & Pain - Malawi: synonym of Achatina immaculata Lamarck, 1822 (junior synonym)
 Achatina nyikaensis Pilsbry, 1909 - Malawi: synonym of Bequaertina pintoi (Bourguignat, 1889) (junior synonym)
 Achatina panthera Férussac, 1832 - Zimbabwe, Mauritius: synonym of Achatina immaculata Lamarck, 1822
 Achatina pellucida L. Pfeiffer, 1840: synonym of Blauneria heteroclita (Montagu, 1808)
 Achatina reticulata Pfeiffer, 1845 - Zanzibar: synonym of Lissachatina reticulata (L. Pfeiffer, 1845)
 Achatina varicosa Pfeiffer, 1845 - South Africa: synonym of Cochlitoma varicosa (L. Pfeiffer, 1861)
 Achatina zanzibarica Bourguignat, 1879 - Tanzania: synonym of Lissachatina zanzibarica (Bourguignat, 1879)
 Achatina zebra Bruguiere, 1792 - South Africa: synonym of Cochlitoma zebra'' (Bruguière, 1792)

References

External links

Achatinidae
Land snails
Land snails in captivity

Achatinidae
Gastropod genera
Taxonomy articles created by Polbot